The kilometre (SI symbol: km;  or ), spelt kilometer in American English and Philippine English, is a unit of length in the International System of Units (SI), equal to one thousand metres (kilo- being the SI prefix for ). It is now the measurement unit used for expressing distances between geographical places on land in most of the world; notable exceptions are the United States and the United Kingdom where the statute mile is the main unit used.

The abbreviations k or K (pronounced ) are commonly used to represent kilometre, but are not recommended by the BIPM. A slang term for the kilometre in the US, UK, and Canadian militaries is klick.

Pronunciation

There are two common pronunciations for the word.

 
 

The first pronunciation follows a pattern in English whereby metric units are pronounced with the stress on the first syllable (as in kilogram, kilojoule and kilohertz) and the pronunciation of the actual base unit does not change irrespective of the prefix (as in centimetre, millimetre, nanometre and so on). It is generally preferred by the British Broadcasting Corporation (BBC), the Canadian Broadcasting Corporation (CBC), and the Australian Broadcasting Corporation (ABC).

Many other users, particularly in countries where the metric system is not widely used, use the second pronunciation with stress on the second syllable. The second pronunciation follows the stress pattern used for the names of measuring instruments (such as micrometer, barometer, thermometer, tachometer and speedometer). The contrast is even more obvious in countries which use the Commonwealth spelling rather than American spelling of the word metre. This pronunciation is irregular because this makes the kilometre the only SI unit in which the stress is on the second syllable.

When Australia introduced the metric system in 1975, the first pronunciation was declared official by the government's Metric Conversion Board. However, the Australian prime minister at the time, Gough Whitlam, insisted that the second pronunciation was the correct one because of the Greek origins of the two parts of the word.

Equivalence to other units of length

{| 
|-
| rowspan="8" style="vertical-align:top;"| 1 kilometre
| ≡
| align=right | 
| metres
|-
| ≈
| align=right | 
|feet
|-
| ≈
| align=right | 
| yards
|-
| ≈
| align=right | 0.621
| miles
|-
| ≈
| align=right | 0.540
| nautical miles
|-
| ≈
| align=right | 
| astronomical units
|-
| ≈
| align=right | 
| light-years
|-
| ≈
| align=right | 
| parsecs
|}

History 

By a decree of 8 May 1790, the French National Constituent Assembly ordered the French Academy of Sciences to develop a new measurement system. In August 1793, the French National Convention decreed the metre as the sole length measurement system in the French Republic and it was based on  millionth of the distance from the orbital poles (either North or South) to the Equator, this being a truly internationally based unit. The first name of the kilometre was "Millaire".
Although the metre was formally defined in 1799, the myriametre ( metres) was preferred to the "kilometre" for everyday use. The term "myriamètre" appeared a number of times in the text of Develey's book Physique d'Emile: ou, Principes de la science de la nature, (published in 1802), while the term kilometre only appeared in an appendix. French maps published in 1835 had scales showing myriametres and "lieues de Poste (Postal leagues of about  metres).

The Dutch, on the other hand, adopted the kilometre in 1817 but gave it the local name of the mijl. It was only in 1867 that the term "kilometer became the only official unit of measure in the Netherlands to represent  metres.

Two German textbooks dated 1842 and 1848 respectively give a snapshot of the use of the kilometre across Europe: the kilometre was in use in the Netherlands and in Italy, and the myriametre was in use in France.

In 1935, the International Committee for Weights and Measures (CIPM) officially abolished the prefix "myria-" and with it the "myriametre", leaving the kilometre as the recognised unit of length for measurements of that magnitude.

Kilometre records
Some sporting disciplines feature  (one-kilometre) races in major events (such as the Olympic Games).  In some disciplines—although world records are catalogued—one-kilometre events remain a minority.

See also 

 Conversion of units, for comparison with other units of length
 Cubic metre
 Metric prefix
 Mileage
 Odometer
 Orders of magnitude (length)
 Square kilometre

References

External links 

 

Metre
+03
1000 (number)